John Erzuah Cofie (born 21 January 1993) is a Ghanaian-born English retired footballer who played as a forward.

He began his career with Burnley and moved to Manchester United for a fee of £1m at the age of 14, but failed to make the break into the first-team. Following loan spells with Royal Antwerp, Sheffield United and Notts County he was released by Manchester United, joining Barnsley on a free transfer in July 2013. He never made a first-team appearance at Barnsley before joining Norwegian club Molde in August 2014. In March 2015, he returned to England, joining Crawley Town. He moved to Wrexham in November 2015. In January 2016, Cofie joined AFC Telford United before moving to Southport in June 2016.

Born in Aboso, Ghana, Cofie moved to England at a young age and has been capped by England at under-17 level.

Club career

Manchester United
Cofie began his football career as a junior player with Burnley. After Burnley rejected a £250,000 bid from Liverpool for Cofie in November 2007, he refused to return to training with the club. After further interest from Chelsea, Cofie was signed by Manchester United in November 2007 and joined their Academy in July 2009. After signing professional terms with United in 2010, he continued to play for the youth side and looked to break through into the reserve side.

In 2012, he was loaned to Belgian side Royal Antwerp to gain first-team experience. The following summer, Cofie signed a one–year loan deal with League One side Sheffield United for the 2012–13 season. After making his debut in the opening game of the season against Shrewsbury Town, Cofie scored his first goal for the club a week later at Colchester United. On 3 January 2013, it was revealed that Cofie had returned to Manchester United, despite having expressed a desire to see out the season with the Blades.

In February 2013, Cofie joined another League One side, Notts County, on a one-month long loan deal. Cofie scored on his debut, in a 1–1 draw with Crewe Alexandra, but his deal was not extended and he returned to United in March having made seven appearances for County. After failing to break through into their first team, Cofie was released by Manchester United at the end of the 2012–13 season.

Barnsley
Available on a free transfer, Cofie signed a one-year deal with Championship side Barnsley on 19 July 2013. Cofie was released by Barnsley at the end of the 2013–14 season.

Molde
On 9 August 2014, Cofie signed a contract with Tippeligaen side Molde FK.

He was released in January 2015 after not making a single first team appearance for the club.

Crawley Town
Cofie signed for Crawley Town on a one-month contract on 25 March 2015.

Wrexham
Cofie signed for Wrexham on non-contract terms on 25 November 2015.

AFC Telford United
Cofie moved to AFC Telford United in the National League North in January 2016.

Southport
In June 2016, Cofie joined National League club Southport on a free transfer. He joined National League North side Bradford Park Avenue on loan on 19 November 2016. On 29 December 2016, he was loaned out once again, this time to National League North club Chorley on a one-month deal.

Stalybridge Celtic
In September 2017, he joined Stalybridge Celtic.

Derry City
Cofie joined Derry City on 28 November 2017.

Hume City
Cofie played for Australian club Hume City of the second-tier league, National Premier Leagues in 2018.

Global F.C.
Cofie was without a club until January 2020, when he was signed in by Philippines Football League side, Global. In July 2020, 27-year-old Cofie announced his retirement to start a coaching career.

Career statistics

References

External links

1993 births
Living people
People from Western Region (Ghana)
Association football forwards
English footballers
English expatriate footballers
England youth international footballers
Burnley F.C. players
Manchester United F.C. players
Royal Antwerp F.C. players
Sheffield United F.C. players
Notts County F.C. players
Barnsley F.C. players
Molde FK players
Crawley Town F.C. players
AFC Telford United players
Wrexham A.F.C. players
Southport F.C. players
Bradford (Park Avenue) A.F.C. players
Chorley F.C. players
Stalybridge Celtic F.C. players
Derry City F.C. players
Hume City FC players
Global Makati F.C. players
English Football League players
Challenger Pro League players
Expatriate footballers in Belgium
Expatriate footballers in Norway
Expatriate association footballers in Ireland
Expatriate soccer players in Australia
Expatriate footballers in the Philippines
English expatriate sportspeople in Belgium
English expatriate sportspeople in Norway
English expatriate sportspeople in Ireland
English expatriate sportspeople in Australia
English expatriate sportspeople in the Philippines